Walter Montagu (died 1615) was an English politician who sat in the House of Commons  in 1614.

Montagu was the second  son of Sir Edward Montagu of Boughton. He was knighted on 11 May 1603. He became High Sheriff of Monmouthshire in 1608.  In 1614, he was elected Member of Parliament for Monmouthshire in the Addled Parliament.

Montagu died in 1615 and was buried at Llanmartin. 

Montagu married Ann Morgan daughter of Henry Morgan of Pencoyd.

References

Year of birth missing
1615 deaths
English MPs 1614
High Sheriffs of Monmouthshire